Reinier Saxton (born 10 February 1988) is a Dutch professional golfer.

Saxton was born in Amstelveen, the son of Jonas Saxton, who used to play on the Challenge Tour and who is now a coach at the Dutch Federation and one of the founders of The Dutch golf course.

Amateur career
Saxton had a successful amateur career, At the age of 15, he won the National Championship Matchplay for the first of five times. He won The Amateur Championship at Turnberry in 2008, the second Dutchman to do so after Rolf Muntz in 1990 at Muirfield. He played the next Open Championship and the Masters Tournament, and won the Spanish Amateur in Sevilla in 2009.

Professional career
Saxton turned professional in July 2009 and was allowed to play six tournaments on the Challenge Tour. He cashed his first prize money at the Scottish Hydro Challenge, finishing 21st. He also played a few events on the NGA Hooters Tour and went to the European Tour qualifying School.

In 2011, Saxton played the third-tier Pro Golf Tour, then known as the EPD Tour. He won three tournaments and got promoted to the Challenge Tour for 2012. He then earned a European Tour card at qualifying school.

Amateur wins
2008 Amateur Championship
2009 Spanish International Amateur Championship

Professional wins (5)

Pro Golf Tour wins (5)

Results in major championships

Note: Saxton never played in the U.S. Open or the PGA Championship.

CUT = missed the half-way cut

Team appearances

Amateur
European Boys' Team Championship (representing the Netherlands): 2003, 2004, 2005 (winners)
Eisenhower Trophy (representing the Netherlands): 2008
St Andrews Trophy (representing the Continent of Europe): 2008
European Amateur Team Championship (representing the Netherlands): 2008, 2009

See also
2011 European Tour Qualifying School graduates

References

External links

Dutch male golfers
European Tour golfers
Sportspeople from Amstelveen
1988 births
Living people
21st-century Dutch people